MBC QueeN was a South Korean non-'free-to-air' television network, which airs programming aimed at women. The channel's slogan is What Women Want.

Munhwa Broadcasting Corporation television networks
Television channels in South Korea
Korean-language television stations
Television channels and stations established in 2009
Women's interest channels